The 1935 Major League Baseball All-Star Game was the third playing of the mid-summer classic between the all-stars of the American League (AL) and National League (NL), the two leagues comprising Major League Baseball. The game was held on July 8, 1935, at Cleveland Stadium in Cleveland, Ohio, hosted by the Cleveland Indians of the American League. The game resulted in the American League defeating the National League 4–1.

Rosters
Players in italics have since been inducted into the National Baseball Hall of Fame.

National League

American League

Game

Umpires

The umpires rotated positions clockwise in the middle of the fifth inning, with Magerkurth moving behind the plate.

Starting lineups

Game summary

Lefty Gomez of the Yankees pitches six innings, gives up three hits and is the winning pitcher. Jimmie Foxx drives in three with a two-run homer and a single. Bill Walker is the losing pitcher.

References

External links
Baseball Almanac
Baseball-Reference

Major League Baseball All-Star Game
Major League Baseball All-Star Game
Baseball competitions in Cleveland
Major League Baseball All Star Game
July 1935 sports events
1930s in Cleveland